EverCrisp is an American apple cultivar developed by the Midwest Apple Improvement Association (MAIA). Trademarked as EverCrisp, the MAIA-1 variety is a cross between two existing apple cultivars: the Honeycrisp and Fuji. Originally produced in Ohio, EverCrisp has since expanded to apple-growing regions across the Midwest in Michigan, Illinois and Indiana,  in the Northeast in Pennsylvania and New York, and in the Northwest in Washington. The apple entered the public marketplace in 2017.

History

EverCrisp 
Mitch Lynd of Lynd Fruit Farms in Patakasla, Ohio developed MAIA-1 during 1998 and 1999. Lynd pollinated and collected the pioneer seeds, Honeycrisp and Fuji, in 1998, germinated the first seedlings in 1998-1999, and carried out much of the organisational work that enabled the seedlings to be disseminated to farmers for experimental cultivation and development. With the help of several apple-growers at Lynd's request, the MAIA-1 variety had the chance to grow and evolve in Midwestern soil. In 2007, the first tester seedlings began to fruit. The initial fruits were selected and evaluated through internal tastings. If successful, the fruit would advance to external tastings. In late-2008, David Doud of Countryline Orchards in Roann, Indiana produced an MAIA-1 apple from a test tree called MDD5-44. Referring to EverCrisp, Doud described MAIA-1 as the "apple with the 21st century crunch" and thought "it was better than any other apple he was growing" MAIA-1, soon to be trademarked as EverCrisp, was the first fruit variety released by the MAIA.

After almost 20 years of development, EverCrisp became publicly available for purchase and consumption in late-October 2017. According to the EverCrisp Apple website, EverCrisp is available from orchards across the Midwest and Northeast, grocery stores such as Lunds & Byerlys and Heinen's Fine Foods, and markets such as Greenmarket Farmers Market in New York and Kissel Hill Fruit Farm & Market in Pennsylvania.  As of October 2018, EverCrisp is grown in 350 orchards across 32 states. The MAIA estimates they have planted more than 600,000 EverCrisp trees across the United States since the apple's development.

EverCrisp is considered a "club apple" variety. This means that apple growers who want to breed, harvest, and sell EverCrisp are required to purchase a membership and license. According to Good Fruit Grower magazine, EverCrisp growers need to purchase a US$100 per year membership, a royalty fee of $1 per tree, trademark and logo fees of 20 cents per tree for four to ten years, and 30 cents per tree for eleven to twenty years. Bill Dodd, the president of the MAIA, released a statement on the MAIA's website in 2014 assuring that "no one will be excluded" from buying into the EverCrisp club. "We're not going to limit who has access," Dodd said.

Midwest Apple Improvement Association (MAIA) 
The Midwest Apple Improvement Association (MAIA) is an organisation founded by apple-growers Mitch Lynd and Ed Fackler in the mid-1990s. Although the MAIA is an independent organisation, it is advised by Dr. Diane Miller at Ohio State University. According to The MAIA, the organisation grew out of a need for apple cultivars that were both suited to the climate and harvesting challenges of the Midwest. The MAIA's membership were looking for a later and longer-harvesting-period fruit than the Honeycrisp, suitable for growing in the central and southern Midwest. Approximately 50 apple-growers in the Midwestern region pledged to commit US$100 per year for 15 years toward crossbreeding and growing new apple varieties on their independent orchards. During MAIA's first breeding year, beginning in the spring of 1997, 5300 seedlings were developed and grown through crossbreeding existing apple cultivars as GoldRush, Sweet Sixteen, Crimson Crisp, HoneyCrisp, Fuji, and Golden Delicious. The MAIA estimates over 50,000 seedlings have been distributed to MAIA members since the organisations inception over two decades ago.

On the back of EverCrisp's success, the MAIA released two new apple varieties in early-2017, 'Crunch-A-Bunch' and 'Bakers Delight'. According to Growing Produce magazine, the new cultivars formally known as MAIA-11 and MAIA-12 were designed not only for commercial growers but for apple hobbyists and "backyard growers" too. The varieties are sold and distributed exclusively by Gurney's Seed and Nursery Company, mail delivering the new MAIA seeds to home apple-growers throughout the US, and through Early Morning and Wafler Nurseries for commercial orchardists. According to Growing Produce, both varieties offer unique flavour profiles and disease, browning and pest resistance.

In 2018 Bill Dodd, president of the MAIA, estimated that 70,000 to 80,000 bushels (a bushel holds approximately 125 medium apples) were to come from the 700,000 apple-trees MAIA have planted since the organisations inception. According to OZY magazine, Dodd predicts that one million apple trees will have been planted under the MAIA by 2020. "One of our goals for our breeding program is to have a full season of varieties," Dodd stated in an interview with Growing Produce magazine in late-2017. According to OZY, these new trademarked apple varieties, 'Summerset', 'Rosalee', 'Sweet Zinger' and 'Ludacrisp', are set to be released by 2021. In the next two to three years, the MAIA expect to have early, midseason, and late-season apple varieties available to the public through orchards, nurseries, independent groceries, and grocery-chains. As of early-2018, the MAIA had more than 450 members worldwide.  By 2019, MAIA reported that it had 700 members.

Designer Fruit 

In an article titled 'New Wave Varieties Upset the Apple Cart', OZY magazine reported in December 2018 that "EverCrisp is among a slew of new commercial [apple] varieties," that are not only "juicy, crunchy and flavourful, [but] can be stored longer and have a higher disease resistance". EverCrisp is firmly within what has been referred to by Quartzy magazine as the "designer fruit era". Among other successful designer apples as Cosmic Crisp, SweeTango and Zestar, EverCrisp is part of a new generation of apple cultivars that are "more delicious, beautiful, convenient for eaters and more productive for growers,"

According to OZY, consumer demand for better quality produce and a wider variety of cultivars are the central forces driving the expanding market of designer apples in the U.S. According to Vox, apple breeders are certainly listening. Organisations such as the MAIA are working hard to meet consumer demand by releasing new apples, each with their own nuances. Vox reports that there's an apple for everyone; some look better than others, some are anti-browning, some are crunchier, warmer, cooler, sweeter or more tart.

According to Quartzy, this wave of new designer cultivars have the potential to trump old favourites such as Red Delicious, Granny Smith, McIntosh and Honeycrisp.OZY too is aware of this trend, reporting that if institutions such as the MAIA and Washington State University continue to release new apple varieties and the steady rate of apple consumption in the U.S. endures, older apple varieties will eventually be displaced.

Beyond the apple itself, marketing has been an important factor in the success of club apples such as EverCrisp and Cosmic Crisp. According to The Packer magazine, Rena Montedoro, vice president of sales and marketing for Crunch Time Apple Growers, said, "the names of apples influence the consumer. They speak to each apple," EverCrisp is marketed as the apple whose "name says it all". The EverCrisp Apple website claims that EverCrisp is a "durable apple [that] maintains sweetness and firmness like no other." Although marketing campaigns for independent patented fruit varieties are a relatively new phenomenon, trademarked apple cultivars such as Cosmic Crisp are already experiencing success.  According to Seattle magazine, Cosmic Crisp's marketing campaign is heavily focused on consumer research. Through think taste tests and focus groups, Cosmic Crisp has been able to generate significant "buzz" before it has even hit the shelf. According to a Quartzy article in late-2017, Washington State has planted more than 12 million Cosmic Crisp trees in preparation for its debut.

Cultivation 
EverCrisp is a late-season apple, ripening in mid-October and harvested in October to November depending on the region.

On David Doud's orchard in north-central Indiana, EverCrisp is ripe between October 10 to October 15. Doud states that EverCrisp can be harvested with no complications for three weekends in October. In northern Indiana, EverCrisp has exhibited watercore if left to hang on the tree till November.

Co-founder of the MAIA Mitch Lynd says that EverCrisp is "more grower friendly," than the Fuji apple, having a higher yield per tree, quipping that Fuji apples grow "lot of tree and not a lot of apples. EverCrisp makes a lot of apples but not a lot of tree."

Appearance and flavour 
According to EverCrisp Apple, the MAIA-1 variety is sweet, crisp, firm and dense just like its parent cultivar Honeycrisp. Director for floral and produce at Tops Friendly Markets, Jeff Cady, describes EverCrisp to have a strong Honeycrisp flavour with a distinct Fuji-like tang. A panel of taste-testers at Bloomberg said EverCrisp had an "in-your-face candied-apple sweetness, with a background tang and monstrous crunch."

EverCrisp describes the appearance of their MAIA-1 variety as a "blushed rosey red over a cream background." Growing Produce notes that while EverCrisp has a texture similar to Honeycrisp, its external shape and appearance most resembles the Fuji apple. The MAIA states EverCrisp has a "slightly harder" exterior than Honeycrisp. In a press release from EverCrisp Apple, Dave Rennhack of Rannhack Orchards Market testified to EverCrisp's capacity to store well. "The apple eats even better after two or three months in the cooler," said Dave. "The flavour mellows out a bit and the coloration turns from an underlying green cast to pineapple gold, making the apple very appealing." Bill Dodd, president of the MAIA, said EverCrisp has the storability of Fuji with the lasting crunch of Honeycrisp. "EverCrisp can last on the counter for two weeks where the Honeycrisp will start losing quality," said Dodd.

Reception 
According to U.S. media sources, EverCrisp has been largely well-received by apple orchardists in the Midwest. In an interview with Good Fruit Grower magazine, Bear Mountain Orchards owner John Lott expressed his opinion regarding the MAIA's management of EverCrisp. "It's being marketed as a variety by growers at every level," Lott said, "[It's] not branded in a box like most club varieties." Bruce Hollabaugh, wholesale apple distributor in Pennsylvania, commends the MAIA's approach to managing EverCrisp as an inclusive club apple. "It's refreshing to see guys like us, a grassroots organisation of growers, that's trying to make apples better for the right reasons." In late-2018, Brain Garwood of Garwood Orchards said "EverCrisp is a great apple for us as it continues to bring people to the orchard," Promoters say EverCrisp is enjoying a rapid increase in activity among fruit farmers, partly because the fruit is said to lack the problems of thin skin and tree disease susceptibility that are alleged to plague the popular Honeycrisp parent.

According to U.S. media sources, this positive sentiment has followed through with independent and wholesale distributors. In an interview with The Produce News in March 2019, Ward Dobbins of United Apple Sales said EverCrisp's quality has gotten "even stronger as [the] trees mature." Dobbins says this has enabled him to "work closely with retail partners in providing supply assurance to give them a true apple advantage late in the season." Vinnie Latessa, director of produce for Heinen's Grocery Store, says that "EverCrisp is rivaling sales of Honeycrisp [and is] a close second in our lineup of apples from a sales and volume standpoint." Scott Swindeman, co-owner of Applewood Orchards in Michigan, said that his supply of fruit from EverCrisp trees has increased by approximately 25 percent since his harvest in 2017.

According to a consumer study conducted in November 2010 by Diane Miller, tree fruit Extension specialist at Ohio State University, EverCrisp "rated higher than Fuji and Cameo and was equivalent to Honeycrisp and SweeTango." The MAIA is optimistic that "once people try EverCrisp, they will come back for more."

References 

Apple cultivars
Ohio State University
American apples